François Salvaing (born 1943, Casablanca) is a French journalist and writer, laureate of the Prix du Livre Inter in 1988.

Biography 
François Salvaing was born in Morocco, then a French Protectorate. After studying literature in Paris, in 1974 he joined L'Humanité, the daily newspaper of the French Communist Party (PCF), as a journalist. He has been a PCF member since 1968.

In 2000, François Salvaing published by Stock a large volume entitled Parti, in which the novelist transposed his experience as a journalist into the character of Frederic Sans.

Work 
1989: De purs désastres
1988: Misayre ! Misayre !, Prix du Livre Inter
1990: Le tour du Tour par trente-six détours, éditions Messidor, 
1991: Une vie de rechange
1994: La Nuda
1996: Vendredi treizième chambre
1998: La Boîte
2000: Parti, Stock, 
2004: Le Cœur trouble and other short stories
2006: Jourdain
2007: Un alibi de rêve
2008: Maud et Matilda
2010: De purs désastres, édition aggravée
2012: Un amour au pied du mur
2014: 818 jours

References

External links 
 François Salvaing on M.E.L.
 François Salvaing on Babelio
 Fin de Parti pour François Salvaing on Libération (7 September 2010)
 La méthode Salvaing on L'Express (30 October 2003)
 Salvaing, juge de paix on Imda.net

1943 births
People from Casablanca
20th-century French journalists
20th-century French writers
21st-century French writers
Prix du Livre Inter winners
Cycling journalists
Living people